Kenneth Randall Light (born 1951) is an American social documentary photographer based in the San Francisco Bay Area.  He is the author of twelve monographs, including Midnight La Frontera, What's Going On? 1969-1974,  Delta Time, Texas Death Row  and, most recently, Course of the Empire, published by Steidl.  He wrote Witness in our Time: Working Lives of Documentary Photographers, a collection of recollections and interviews with 29 of the world's most well-known photographers, editors and curators of the genre. He has had his photographs included as part of photo essays and portfolios in newspapers, magazines and other media, has been exhibited worldwide and is part of museum collections such as SF Museum of Modern Art and International Center of Photography. Light was also a co-founder of Fotovision, the Mother Jones International Fund for Documentary Photography and he is the recipient of a Guggenheim Fellowship and three National Endowment for the Arts photography fellowships. He is also a professor at the Graduate School of Journalism at UC Berkeley where he holds the Reva and David Logan chair in photojournalism and he is the director of the school's Logan documentary photography gallery.

Kenneth Baker, the San Francisco Chronicle's art critic, described his black-and-white imagery as placing his work in the lineage of Walker Evans, Dorothea Lange and Robert Frank.

Early life
Light was born in 1951 in the Bronx, New York City, in the United States of America. He would later move with his parents to East Meadow, on Long Island in New York.

Career 
Light started shooting film photography when he was 18 years old while studying government and sociology at Ohio University (1969-1973). Having access to his father's camera, he documented important events such as Richard Nixon’s campaign in Ohio, the moratorium to end the Vietnam War in Washington DC and the Cambodia invasion protests on his campus. The photographs from this last event were the ones that caused his first break in journalism. Even though he was arrested that day because of his association with the "Underground Press", his film came back to his hands; he sent it to New York and it was published around the world.

After he graduated in 1973, Light moved to California and he has been a freelance photographer focusing on social issues in America for more than 50 years (as of 2020). He has also been teaching photojournalism at the Graduate School of Journalism of the University of California Berkeley since 1983. He holds the post of Reva and David Logan Professor of PhotoJournalism at the U.C. Berkeley Graduate School of Journalism. He was the first photographer to become a Laventhol Visiting Professor at Columbia University Graduate School of Journalism and is a Guggenheim Fellow (2021).

Work

Between 1983 and 1987 along the California/Mexico border, Light rode along with US Border Patrol agents in the middle of the night as looked for illegal aliens.  The resulting strobe lit images caught against the dark of night of the caught illegal aliens were published in To The Promised Land by Aperture and in 2018 he resisted this work and TBW Books published Midnight la frontera in 2020. The S.F. MoMA purchased all 86 prints for its permanent collection.

In 1989-1993 He photographed extensively in the Mississippi Delta and created Delta Time with an introduction by the Civil Rights activist Bob Moses.

in 1993 he was called unexpectedly by Suzanne Donovan a friend and writer and asked to work with her on a project about Texas Death Row. In 1994 they were given unlimited access to Death Row in Huntsville, Texas and Light spent a year making extensive trips to photograph Death Row. The photographs were widely published in magazines worldwide in 1995 (Newsweek (6 pages), Paris Match (8 pages) etc. In 1996 a book Texas Death Row was published. The Death Row project and the birth of his daughter Allison Light (1994) had Light step back from his long time practice of in-depth projects. He started a text project interviewing the many photo colleagues and friends about their working methods. This led to a grant from the Hasselblad Foundation and the eventual publication of a text Witness In Our Time: Working Lives of Documentary Photography (Smithsonian Institution Press) now in its second edition. It has been adapted by numerous University programs and is a standard in documentary education.

From 1999 to 2002, Light photographed rural poverty in Appalachia. This work was published in Coal Hollow (2005), with Melanie Light, his wife.

Light spent five years photographic scenes in California's Great Central Valley, documenting the mix of poverty and wealth. He published photographs from this period, with commentary, in Valley of Shadows and Dreams (2012).

In 2014 Light launched a Kickstarter campaign to self-publish What’s Going On: America 1969-1974. He reached a total of $41,342 from his $30,000 goal. This book is his early photographic work starting when he was 18 years old and a movement activist and photographer with the underground press.

From 2010 until 2020 Light traveled across America photographing a country that he realized was the most fragile of organisms. The photographs of the earlier years in this book create the context for understanding how America lost its way. Light reached all four corners of the country to document people across race, class and political lines. We see the heartland and the coastal cities, Wall Street and rural small towns. As he continued, seismic changes erupted across America and the country descended into an age of crisis. He photographed protests and Washington politicians in Congress and the White House, climate change disasters and environmental defenders, the rise of the regime of Donald Trump, the Trump rallies and America’s reactions to it all. He comprehensively probed the fractured social and economic condition, going beyond the tropes of inequality we all recite by heart to create a visual portrait of a country mired in calamity, its people deeply splintered, angry and in pain. The resulting portrait of the American social landscape is a riveting historical and visual record of a complicated country in a complicated time. It is compelling, and one of the earliest photographic accounts of an age that historians and citizens will be scrutinizing for generations to come. This may be one of his most important books, 209 photos and essay written by him, and published by Steidl.

Victim of forgery
One of his early photos became the subject of copyright infringement controversy. This image showed John Kerry and Jane Fonda speaking together at an anti-Vietnam War protest but it turned out that Jane Fonda was never at that event. Ken Light's original photograph was digitally altered for partisan purposes and so it was published during the 2004 presidential election campaign.

Publications

Books
 In the Fields (1982). Published by Harvest Press. Introduction by Paul Taylor (Dorothea Lange's husband).
 With These Hands. (1986) Published by Pilgrim Press. Introduction by César Chávez. 
 To The Promised Land. (1988) Published by Aperture. Introduction by Richard Rodriguez
 Delta Time. (1995) Published by the Smithsonian Institution Press. Introduction by Bob Moses. This work has been published in the award-winning documentary film Freedom on My Mind and the film Black is... Black Ain't by Marlon Riggs among other media. 
 Texas Death Row. (1997) Published by the University Press of Mississippi. Text by Suzanne Donovan. Used as a reference in multiple platforms such as the New Yorker Magazine story about Todd Willingham, Trial by Fire, Did Texas Execute an innocent man? (2009).
 Witness in our Time: Working Lives of Documentary Photographers (2005)  - Editor. Published by the Smithsonian Institution Press. Words of Mary Ellen Mark, Sebastião Salgado and Eugene Richards and others. 
 Coal Hollow. (2006) Published by University of California. Written by Ken Light and Melanie Light with forewords by Orville Schell and Robert B. Reich. 
 Valley of Shadows & Dreams. (2011) Published by Heyday Books. Foreword by Thomas Steinbeck and text by Melanie Light. 
 What’s Going On?. (2015) Published by Light² Media. Text by Ken Light.
 ″Midnight La Frontera". (2020) Published by TBW
 ″Picturing Resistance". (2020) Published by Random House/Ten Speed Press
 "Course of the Empire". (2021) Published by Steidl

Exhibitions 
 2004: Photographs from Delta Time as part of an exhibit on William Eggelston at S.F. Museum of Modern Art
 2005-2006: Coal Hollow at International Center of Photography (ICP) in New York City
 2008-2009: Coal Hollow at Smith College Art Museum
 2011-2013: Picturing Modernity exhibit at the San Francisco Museum of Modern Art - What's Going On?
 2012: Valley of Shadows & Dreams at Oakland Museum of California
 2017: Dorothea Lange: Politics of Seeing at Oakland Museum of California
 2017: Resistors: 50 Years of Social Movement. Photography curated by Ken and Melanie Light. Berkeley Art Center

Curated exhibitions
These are exhibitions of the work of others, of which Light was the curator or co-curator.
 2017: Resistors: 50 Years of Social Movement Photography, Berkeley Art Center.

Awards and grants

Awards 
2021 Guggenheim Fellowship
 1990: Media Alliance - Meritorious Achievement award for photography
 1990: Thomas M. Storke International Journalism Award from the World Affairs Council
 1992: Judges Special Recognition (Cannon Photo Essayist) in the Annual University of Missouri/NPPA Pictures of the Year competition
 2012: Valley of Shadows & Dreams received the California Book Award -gold medal- for "Contribution to Publishing" by the California Commonwealth Club
 2015: What's going on? - POY award Best Photography Book - Judges' Special Recognition, Ken Light, Light Squared Media (Light2 Media),

Grants 
 1973: International Fund for Concerned Photography 
 1975: The California Arts Commission, Artist in Communities 
 1978,1982: The Film Fund (w/LOHP-U.C. Berkeley)
1980 National Endowment for the Arts (NEA) Photographers Fellowship
1980 National Endowment for the Arts (NEA) Survey Grant
1982 National Endowment for the Arts (NEA) Photographers Fellowship
 1983,1985,1995,2003: The Max and Anna Levinson Foundation 
 1985: The Rosenberg Foundation (w/National Farm worker Migrant Ministry) 
 1994: Erna and Victor Hasselblad Foundation 
 2000: Puffin Foundation
 2005: The Open Society Institute
 2017: Jonathan Logan Family Foundation

References

External links 
 Ken Light's official website
 Ken Light's photographs on the International Center of Photography
 Bronx Times on Ken Light's latest book
 SFGATE on the book Valley of Shadows and Dreams
 Huffington Post on Light's book What is Going On?
 Ken Light on Fonda Kerry photo controversy
 Ken Light's interview about Fonda-Kerry photo on The Guardsman

1951 births
Living people
American photojournalists
Social realist artists
Photographers from the Bronx
Ohio University alumni
University of California, Berkeley Graduate School of Journalism faculty
National Endowment for the Arts Fellows